Barinas is a city in west central Venezuela. According to the 2011 census, its population is 353,442. It is the capital of the Barinas Municipality and the State of Barinas. The city of Barinas is known as the capital of the Llanos.

History 
The original city was founded under the name Altamira de Caceres on June 30, 1577, by Captain Juan Andres Varela fulfilling orders of the governor of La Grita Francisco de Cáceres, who had founded this Andean city and established it governorate in 1576.

In 1786 Barinas state was established in the territories of the existing states of Barinas and Apure. The city became the capital of the state and an important bastion of the patriots during the War of Independence. Cristóbal Mendoza, the first President of Venezuela, lived and practiced his profession in Barinas.

Etymology 
The name of the city comes from an indigenous word which identifies a strong wind that occurs during the rainy season, from the valleys of Santo Domingo.

Geography 
The city is located in the northwest part of the state, along the river Santo Domingo in the Andean foothills about 165 km from the city of Mérida and 525 km from Caracas. The city has about 270,000 inhabitants and is the most populous in the state of Barinas and one of the largest Venezuelan llanos cities alongside Calabozo, Acarigua-Araure, Guanare and San Fernando de Apure. The city is located about 188 meters above sea level.

Economy 

The city has become an important administrative centre being the headquarters of major educational institutions such as the National Experimental University of the Western Plains "Ezequiel Zamora" and the more immediate market for everything produced in the state both in the field of agriculture and animal husbandry and oil exploitation. In recent years an important tourist industry has emerged in the city since it has served as a base or point of entry to all eco-tourism locations in the region of Western Plains.

LAI - Línea Aérea IAACA, an airline, had its headquarters on the grounds of Barinas Airport in Barinas.

Transport 
The city has bus transportation, consisting of 5 lines that run throughout the city with over 80 different routes. It also has a large number of taxis or rental cars providing additional transportation services in the city.

Barinas International Airport, serves Barinas with its two runways in the form of the letter "L".

Sights 

 The Marques Palace
 Museum Alberto Arvelo Torrealba
 Cathedral of Our Lady of Pilar of Zaragoza and Santiago
 Santo Domingo River
 Squares: Student's Square, Bolivar Square, Zamora Square, Francisco de Miranda Square, Poet's Square
 Walk of the Trujillanos
 The Federation Park
 Los Mangos Park
 Business Centers: C.C. Cima, C.C. El Dorado, C.C. Forum, C.C. Vemeca.
 Olympic Stadium Agustin Tovar "La Carolina"
 Botanical Garden of Unellez
 Punto Fresco Roundabout
 The house of Brutalis

Gallery images

See also 

List of cities in Venezuela

Notable residents 
 Ronald Hernández, professional footballer for Atlanta United and the Venezuela national football team
 Jorge Linares, Multiple-weight world boxing champion.
 Darwin Matheus, professional footballer for Atlanta United 2

References

External links 
Portal of Barinas state

Populated places in Barinas (state)
Populated places established in 1577
Barinas, Venezuela